Geoalkalibacter ferrihydriticus  is a Gram-negative, obligately anaerobic, non-spore-forming, iron-reducting bacterium from the genus of Geoalkalibacter which has been isolated from sediments from the Lake Khadin in Russia.

References

 

Desulfuromonadales
Bacteria described in 2007